The jig is up may refer to:

The Jig Is Up, a 1993 song by Jim Witter from his self-titled album
The Jig Is Up, a 1995 song by Jill Sobule from her self-titled album
The Jig Is Up, a 2004 album by American fiddle player Peter Stampfel
The Jig Is Up, a 2008 song by Edison Glass, from their album Time Is Fiction
The Jig Is Up, a 2010 song by Quasi, from their album American Gong

See also
Jig (disambiguation)